Robert Rugge (by 1503 – 18 February 1558/9), of Norwich, Norfolk, was an English politician. He was a Member of Parliament (MP) for Norwich in 1545 and mayor of the city in 1545-46 and 1550-51.

Early life 
Robert Rugge was the son of William Rugge (d.1512) of Northrepps, by Agnes. He was the much younger brother of William Rugge, Bishop of Norwich (d.1550), and the father of John Rugge, Achdeacon of Wells (d.February 1581/2), and Francis Rugge, Mayor of Norwich (1535 – 18 October 1607). He obtained properties from his brother, the Bishop. William Rugge, abbot of St. Bennet's, conveyed the manor of Greengate to Robert Rugge, his brother, and alderman of Norwich in 1533. William sold him Ashmanagh in Hoveton. The family owned property there until at least 1618.

Rugge married twice. The first time to Elizabeth, daughter of Robert Wood of Norwich, gentleman of the horse to Charles Brandon, Duke of Suffolk. They had 5 sons and 3 daughters. His second wife was Alice (1494 – 11 July 1566), daughter of William Wayte of Tittleshall, and widow of William Hare of Beeston.

Records 
Of the chapel of St. Mary, the south isle, in St. John the Baptist's Church in Madder-Market, Norwich,  Frances Blomefield, Rector of Fersfield in Norfolk, writes:

From the four sons' mouths, Deus propicius esto animabus parentum nostrorum. The daughters are pulled off, a label as that before, remains:

{{quote|Of your Charytie pray for the Soules of Robarte Rugge Esquier, sometime Alderman, and twyse Mayer of this worshipfull Citie of Norwich, and Elizabeth his Wyffe, which had Issue betwyrt them five Sonnes & three Daughters, and the said Rob. Rugge departed this trancitory life the xviii Daye of Februarie in the yeare of our Lord God 1558, of whose Soules say you, JESU have mercye Amen.}}

The Reverend Edmund Farrer in his travels through the church heraldry of Norfolk identifies the arms above, a chevron engrailed, between three pierced mullets, as those of Rugge'', and adds the following poetic description of the Mercer's Company's coat of arms:
A demi-virgin couped below the shoulders nebulée, vested

and crowned with an Eastern coronet, and wreathed

around the temples with roses (The Mercers Company,

Gules, a demi-virgin couped below the shoulders, issuing

from clouds all proper, vested, or crowned with an

Eastern coronet of the last, her hair dishevelled, and

wreathed around the temples with roses of the second,

all within an orle of clouds proper. There is no sign

here of the "orle of clouds," or what on a brass
usually takes its place, "a bordure".

A loveknot is found on the stone in the isle, with the initials R & E.

His second wife Alice lies in Plumstead Parva.

On a grave-stone, in the church;—Here lyeth Alice Wayte, first wife to William Hare, Esq. and after to Robert Rugge, and mother to the lady Etheldred Warner, who dyed here in much vertue and quiet, 72 years, and departed hence to live for ever, the first day of July, A°. Dni. 1566.

Descendants 
This daughter, who was the daughter and heir of William Hare, Esq. of Beeston in Norfolk, married Thomas Hobart, Esq. son and heir of Miles Hobart, Esq., 2nd son of Sir James Hobart, by whom she had two sons, Miles and Henry. Thomas Hobart died on 26 March 1560. She then married Sir Edward Warner, Lieutenant of the Tower of London, who died on November 7, 1565. Her third marriage was to William Blennerhasset, Esq. She died on 16 July 1581.

She is the Audrey (common nickname for Etheldred) named in a tablet hanging in the church where her mother is buried.

References

1559 deaths
Politicians from Norwich
Mayors of Norwich
English MPs 1545–1547
Year of birth uncertain